The following is a list of incinerators in the UK that treat municipal waste:

Operating

 Allerton waste recovery park, North Yorkshire
 Allington Quarry Waste Management Facility
 Ardley ERF
 Baldovie WtE (Dundee)
 Beddington Energy Recovery Facility (Sutton, London)
 Bolton WtE
 Chineham EfW
 Cornwall Energy Recovery Centre
 Crossness STW Sludge Powered Generator (Belvedere, London)
 CSWDC (Coventry)
 Devonport Dockyard Incinerator
 Dudley EfW
 Eastcroft EfW (Nottingham)
 Exeter ERF
 Fawley Incinerator
 Ferrybridge Multifuel 1 (West Yorkshire)
 Ferrybridge Multifuel 2, (West Yorkshire)
 Glanford Power Station
 Gloucestershire EfW
 Great Blakenham
 Greatmoor EfW (Buckinghamshire)
 Hartlebury EfW
 Isle of Man Incinerator
 Isle of Wight gasification facility
 Kirklees EfW
 La Collette WtE (Jersey)
 Lakeside EfW (Colnbrook)
 Leeds RERF
 Lerwick Incinerator
 Lincoln ERF (Lincolnshire)
 London EcoPark (Edmonton, London)
 Marchwood ERF
 Millerhill Recycling and Energy Recovery Centre
 Milton Keynes Waste Recovery Park
 Newhaven ERF
 Newlincs EfW facility
 North Hykeham Incinerator
 Peterborough ERF
 Portsmouth ERF
 Red Moss Landfill
 Riverside Resource Recovery ERF (Belvedere, London)
 Runcorn EfW
 SELCHP (South Bermondsey, London)
 Sheffield ERF
 Shrewsbury Incinerator
 Staffordshire ERF (Four Ashes)
 Stoke EfW
 Teesside EfW
 Thetford Incinerator (Biomass)
 Tyseley Energy from Waste Plant
 Westfield Incinerator (Poultry litter)
 Wolverhampton EfW

Under construction

 Avonmouth Resource Recovery Centre, Bristol
 NESS Energy Project, Aberdeen
 Rookery South Energy Recovery Facility, Bedfordshire

Planned

Decommissioned
Bellozanne Incinerator
Byker Incinerator
Gateshead Incinerator
Polmadie Incinerator
Portrack Incinerator
South Shields Incinerator
Sunderland Incinerator
Tynemouth Incinerator

References

External lists

UKWIN list of around 23 existing and 80 potential facilities
Channel 4 News list of 30 incinerators being "seriously considered or planned by councils"
Defra list of PFI projects (some include incineration)
Environment Agency's Waste Incineration Spreadsheet (2006)
Tradebe Fawley

Incinerators
Incinerators in the United Kingdom
Waste management in the United Kingdom
Incinerators
Incinerators